This is a list of mines in Chile organized by product.

Copper
Candelaria mine
Mantos Blancos mine
Mantoverde mine

Gold
Candelaria mine
El Indio Gold Belt
El Toqui mine
Madre de Dios Mine
Maricunga Gold Mine
Pascua Lama
San José Mine

Silver
Candelaria mine

Titanium
Cerro Blanco mine

Chile